This list of countries by traffic-related death rate shows the annual number of road fatalities per capita per year, per number of motor vehicles, and per vehicle-km in some countries in the year the data was collected.

According to the World Health Organization (WHO), road traffic injuries caused an estimated 1.35 million deaths worldwide in 2016. That is, one person is killed every 26 seconds on average.

Only 28 countries, representing 449 million people (seven percent of the world's population), have laws that address the five risk factors of speed, drunk driving, helmets, seat-belts and child restraints. Over a third of road traffic deaths in low- and middle-income countries are among pedestrians and cyclists. However, less than 35 percent of low- and middle-income countries have policies in place to protect these road users.
The average rate was 17.4 per 100,000 people. Low-income countries now have the highest annual road traffic fatality rates, at 24.1 per 100,000, while the rate in high-income countries is lowest, at 9.2 per 100,000.

Seventy-four percent of road traffic deaths occur in middle-income countries, which account for only 53 percent of the world's registered vehicles. In low-income countries it is even worse. Only one percent of the world's registered cars produce 16 percent of world's road traffic deaths. This indicates that these countries bear a disproportionately high burden of road traffic deaths relative to their level of motorization.

There are large disparities in road traffic death rates between regions. The risk of dying as a result of a road traffic injury is highest in the African Region (26.6 per 100 000 population), and lowest in the European Region (9.3 per 100 000).

Adults aged between 15 and 44 years account for 59 percent of global road traffic deaths. 77 percent of road deaths are males.

The total fatalities figures comes from the WHO report (table A2, column point estimate, pp. 264–271) and are often an adjusted number of road traffic fatalities in order to reflect the different reporting and counting methods among the many countries (e.g., "a death after how many days since accident event is still counted as a road fatality?" (by international standard adjusted to a 30-day period), or "to compensate for under-reporting in some countries".

List

The table shows that the highest death tolls tend to be in African countries, and the lowest in European countries. The table first lists WHO geographic regions before alphabetically sorted countries.

See also
Epidemiology of motor vehicle collisions
Traffic collision
Road traffic safety
Smeed's law
List of countries by vehicles per capita

Nations:
List of motor vehicle deaths in Australia by year
Road toll (Australia and New Zealand)
List of motor vehicle deaths in Iceland by year
List of motor vehicle deaths in Japan by year
List of road traffic accidents deaths in Republic of Ireland by year
Motor vehicle fatality rate in U.S. by year
Road safety in Europe

General:
 List of causes of death by rate

Notes

References

External links
 Annual Accident Report 2018 ( including deaths for all EU countries 2007–2016), European Road Safety Observatory.

Traffic-related death rate
Automotive safety
Motorcycle safety
Road transport
Road safety